Aciagrion africanum is a species of damselfly in the family Coenagrionidae. It is found in Cameroon, the Republic of the Congo, Ivory Coast, Guinea, Guinea-Bissau, Liberia, Malawi, Mozambique, Nigeria, Uganda, Zambia, Zimbabwe, and possibly Tanzania. Its natural habitats are subtropical or tropical dry forests, subtropical or tropical moist lowland forests, moist savanna, subtropical or tropical dry shrubland, subtropical or tropical moist shrubland, rivers, shrub-dominated wetlands, freshwater marshes, and intermittent freshwater marshes.

References

 

Coenagrionidae
Insects described in 1908
Taxonomy articles created by Polbot